Alexandria Maillot is a Canadian actress, singer and songwriter. She is known for her extensive music career, as well as her role as Lucie in the 2011 Canadian romance horror film Red Riding Hood.

Life and career

Alexandria Maillot was born in Prince George, British Columbia. After moving to Vancouver Island as a child, she began playing music and starting to sing at the age of seven. At the age of 16, she took part in the 2009 Peak Performance Project, an artist development program curated by radio station 102.7 The Peak.

On June 10, 2016, she released her debut full-length album Time, featuring the single "Sunday Sara".

Over 2017, Alexandria Maillot recorded in Montreal, Quebec with producer Samuel Woywitka. She released the single "Make It Out" on September 14, 2018. Her follow up single "Messed It Up", released November 9, 2018, garnered attention across Canada, including airplay on The Verge (XM).

Throughout 2019, she toured extensively, including appearances at Reeperbahn Festival in Hamburg, Germany, Halifax Pop Explosion, and a cross Canada tour supporting Louise Burns. In the fall of 2019, she announced her sophomore record Benevolence. It was officially released on November 22, 2019, and garnered praise from outlets like CBC Q, Exclaim!, and Earmilk.

Discography

Studio albums
Just Another Girl (EP) (June 22, 2012)
Time (June 10, 2016)
Benevolence (November 22, 2019)

Singles
"Sunday Sara" (April 15, 2016)
"Make It Out" (September 14, 2018)
"Messed It Up" (November 9, 2018)
"The Judge" (September 27, 2019)

Filmography

Film

Awards and nominations

References

External links

Alexandria Maillot Band Camp

Year of birth missing (living people)
Living people
Actresses from Vancouver
Canadian film actresses
Canadian women singers
Musicians from Vancouver